The Military ranks of Kenya are the military insignia used by the Kenya Defence Forces. Being a former colony of the United Kingdom, Kenya shares a rank structure similar to that of the United Kingdom, especially the British Army.

Commissioned officer ranks
The rank insignia of commissioned officers.

Other ranks
The rank insignia of non-commissioned officers and enlisted personnel.

References

External links
 

Kenya and the Commonwealth of Nations
Kenya
Military of Kenya